Badaşqan (also, Badashgan, Badashkan, until 2003;. Bədəşxan and Badashkhan) is a village and municipality in the Babek District of Nakhchivan, Azerbaijan. It is located 6 km in the north from the district center, on the left bank of the Nakhchivanchay River, in the Nakhchivan plain. Its population is busy with grain growing, vegetable-growing and animal husbandry. There are library and a medical center in the village. It has a population of 281.

References 

Populated places in Babek District